is a monthly Japanese  manga magazine published by Shogakukan and issued on the 28th of every month.

History

Flowers originally started out under the name , which was also published by Shogakukan. Petit Flower was founded in 1980 as a quarterly magazine, and became defunct in March 2002. It was relaunched as Flowers in April 2002. Before ceasing publication, Petit Flower serialized a number of works by Moto Hagio, including Iguana Girl, Mesh, Marginal, and A Cruel God Reigns.

Serializations

Current
 Hatsukoi no Sekai by Keiko Nishi (since 2016)
 Boku no Giovanni by Hozumi (since 2016)
 Marronnier Ōkoku no Shichinin no Kishi by Nao Iwamoto (since 2016)
 Fushigi Yûgi: Byakko Senki by Yuu Watase (since 2017)
 Mystery to Iu Nakare by Yumi Tamura (since 2017)
 Ao no Hana, Utsuwa no Mori by Yuki Kodama (since 2018)
 Kaguya Den by Chiho Saito (since 2018)
 Poe no Ichizoku: Himitsu no Hanazono by Moto Hagio (since 2019)
 Utagawa Hyakkei by Akimi Yoshida (since 2019)
 Black Rose Alice: D.C. al fine by Setona Mizushiro (since 2020)

Former
 Yasha by Akimi Yoshida (2002)
 Kaze Hikaru by Taeko Watanabe (2002–2020)
 Amakusa 1637 by Michiyo Akaishi (2002–2006)
 7 Seeds by Yumi Tamura (2002–2017)
 Otherworld Barbara by Moto Hagio (2002–2005)
 Eve no Nemuri by Akimi Yoshida (2003–2005)
 Shirokuma Cafe by Aloha Higa (2006–2014)
 Umimachi Diary by Akimi Yoshida (2006–2018)
  Machi de Uwasa no Tengu no Ko by Nao Iwamoto (2007–2013)
 Kids on the Slope by Yuki Kodama (2007–2012)
 Otoko no Isshō by Keiko Nishi (2008–2009)
 Girls Bijutsu by Machiko Kyō (2010–2011)
 Ane no Kekkon by Keiko Nishi (2010–2014)
 Shitsuren Chocolatier by Setona Mizushiro (2010–2014)
 Nanohana by Moto Hagio (one-shot collection; 2011–2012)
 Shiki no Zenjitsu by Hozumi (one-shot collection; 2011–2012)
 Torikae Baya by Chiho Saito (2012–2017)
 Sayonara Sorcier by Hozumi (2012–2013)
 Away by Moto Hagio (2013–2015)
 Kingdom of Gold, Kingdom of Water by Nao Iwamoto (2014–2016)
 Usemono Yado by Hozumi (2014–2015)
 Katsu Curry no Hi by Keiko Nishi (2014–2015)
 Poe no Ichizoku: Haru no Yume by Moto Hagio (2016–2017)
 Revolutionary Girl Utena: After the Revolution by Chiho Saito (2017–2018)
 Poe no Ichizoku: Unicorn by Moto Hagio (2018–2019)

Notes

References

External links
  
 Official Twitter account 
 Official circulation numbers at JMPA 
 Official publication information at Shogakukan AdPocket 
 

2002 establishments in Japan
Josei manga magazines
Magazines established in 2002
Monthly manga magazines published in Japan
Shogakukan magazines